Sadie Liza Frost (née Vaughan; born 19 June 1965) is an English actress, producer and fashion designer, who ran fashion label Frost French (until its closure in 2011) and a film production company (Blonde to Black Pictures).

Early life
Frost was born in Islington, north London, in 1965 to psychedelic artist David Vaughan, who worked for the Beatles, and his then-16-year-old muse, actress Mary Davidson.

She has described her childhood as a "chaotic but positive experience". She spent much of her youth in Ashton-under-Lyne, Lancashire, after her parents separated. Her parents had six relationships between them, which gave her ten siblings, including fellow actresses Holly Davidson and Jade Davidson; primary school teacher Jessi Frost; brothers called Gabriel Jupiter and Tobias Vaughan; and a sister named Sunshine Purple Tara Velvet.

Career

Frost appeared in a Jelly Tots advertisement in 1968 at age three and appeared with Morecambe and Wise in 1970 at age five. She attained a scholarship to the Italia Conti Academy, but after an early eating disorder, she gave up acting at 13 and attended Hampstead School instead.

As an actress, Frost has performed in Press Gang and Casualty. Her first film role was in Empire State (1987), although her most memorable film appearance was as the beautiful, ill-fated Lucy Westenra in Francis Ford Coppola's Bram Stoker's Dracula (1992). She earned her living mainly through appearing in music videos, including for Pulp's song "Common People", Planet Perfecto featuring Grace's "Not Over Yet '99", and various productions for Spandau Ballet, where she met first husband Gary Kemp. Frost and Kemp appeared together in the film The Krays (1990). They appeared in two more films together. One of these films, Magic Hunter (1994), required them to participate in a love scene, although they were separated at the time.

Frost took a role opposite Jude Law in Paul W. S. Anderson's directorial debut Shopping. After marrying Law and having three children with him, she cut down on her acting commitments in the late 1990s, and moved into producing and co-founding the production company Natural Nylon.

In 1999, Frost co-founded the fashion label Frost French with her friend Jemima French. The label started in lingerie and expanded into clothing collections. Frost French won Elles Designers of the Year Award 2004. In 2004, she wrote, presented, and produced a short-lived series What Sadie did next... for E4, and in 2005 appeared in Eating with...Sadie Frost on BBC2. In March 2006, Frost flew to South Africa to part-fund an orphanage for the Homes of Hope project. In 2009, she made her West End debut in Touched ... For the Very First Time, a new one-woman show by Zoë Lewis, directed by Douglas Rintoul and produced by Imogen Lloyd Webber.

In January 2010, Frost starred in the play Fool for Love alongside Carl Barat, formerly of The Libertines. The play showed at the Riverside Studios theatre.

Personal life
In 1981, when 16 and dancing in a music video, Frost met Spandau Ballet's Gary Kemp. They married shortly before her 23rd birthday, on 7 May 1988. Their son, Finlay, was born in 1990. Frost and Kemp were married for seven years and divorced on 19 August 1995.

Frost met Jude Law during the work on the 1994 film Shopping. They married in September 1997 and have three children: son Rafferty (born 1996), daughter Iris (born 2000), and son Rudy (born 2002). Frost and Law divorced on 29 October 2003. Frost named model Kate Moss as Iris's godmother and BBC Radio 1 DJ Nick Grimshaw as Rudy's godfather.

She is a vegetarian.

Filmography

References

External links

 
 
 Sadie Frost Charity Information

1965 births
Living people
Actresses from London
Alumni of the Italia Conti Academy of Theatre Arts
English film actresses
English television actresses
English stage actresses
English film producers
English theatre managers and producers
Women theatre managers and producers